The Love Sabah Party or in  is a political party of Sabah, Malaysia. The PCS is a relatively new party and was among 20 new party registrations approved by the Registrar of Society in 2013.

PCS joined together with the Sabah Progressive Party (SAPP) and State Reform Party (STAR) in the United Sabah Alliance (USA), but later left the coalition over disagreements. The party then signed political pact with the Sabah Native Co-operation Party in March 2018 with the ultimate goal to restore the rights, dignity and identity of the ‘Anak Negeri’ (native) or the firstborn in the state of Sabah.

Anifah Aman took over as President from his outgoing predecessor Wilfred Bumburing who was elected as the new Deputy  President after winning the position uncontested during the party 2nd Biennal General Meeting on 26 July 2020. The party BGM also passed an resolution for the party to be renamed as Sabah People's Awareness Party (Parti Kesedaran Rakyat Sabah), with a new flag and symbol upon RoS approval.

Elected representatives

Senators 

 His Majesty's appointee:
 Anifah Aman

State election results

See also 
 Politics of Malaysia
 List of political parties in Malaysia

References

External links 
 Official Website
 

Political parties in Sabah
Political parties established in 2013
2013 establishments in Malaysia